Harishankar Road railway station is a railway station on the East Coast Railway network in the state of Odisha, India. It serves Lathore village. Its code is HSK. It has two platforms. Passenger, Express and Superfast trains halt at Harishankar Road railway station.

Major trains

 Korba–Visakhapatnam Express
 Puri–Durg Express
 Samata Express
 Bilaspur–Tirupati Express

See also
 Balangir district

References

Railway stations in Balangir district
Sambalpur railway division